Solanum ternatum is a species of plant in the family Solanaceae. Its natural habitat is subtropical or tropical moist montane forests.

Solanum ternifolium as described by Erich Werdermann is an invalid name for this plant that is sometimes still seen. Altogether, the following synonyms are assigned to this species:
 Solanum dendrophilum Bitter
 Solanum diffusum Ruiz & Pav.
S. diffusum Roxb. ex Wall. is S. virginianum L.. S. diffusum Link ex Roem. & Schult. is S. pseudocapsicum.
 Solanum diffusum var. miozygum (Bitter) J.F.Macbr.
 Solanum diffusum ssp. miozygum Bitter
 Solanum feddei Bitter
 Solanum moritzianum Bitter
 Solanum semievectum Bitter
 Solanum semiscandens Bitter
 Solanum subquinatum Bitter
 Solanum ternifolium Werderm.

The mysterious S. ternifolium was classified as Data Deficient endemic of Ecuador by the IUCN, before it was synonymized with the widespread S. ternatum.

References

Footnotes
 
  (2004): Solanum ternatum. Version of December 2004. Retrieved 2008-SEP-30.

ternatum
Taxonomy articles created by Polbot
Taxobox binomials not recognized by IUCN